Bombed may refer to:
something which has been hit by bombs, also the past tense of the verb "to bomb"
the state of being drunk
"Bombed," a song by Mark Lanegan from his album Bubblegum
Bombed, an enemy in the video game Super Smash Bros. Brawl